The red-lored amazon or red-lored parrot (Amazona autumnalis) is a species of amazon parrot, native to tropical regions of the Americas, from eastern Mexico south to Ecuador where it occurs in humid evergreen to semi-deciduous forests up to 1,100 m altitude. It is absent from the Pacific side of Central America north of Costa Rica. Not originally known from El Salvador, a pair - perhaps escaped from captivity - nested successfully in 1995 and 1996 in the outskirts of San Salvador and the species might expand its range permanently into that country in the future. This species has also established feral populations in several California cities.

Taxonomy
The red-lored amazon was formally described in 1758 by the Swedish naturalist Carl Linnaeus in the tenth edition of his Systema Naturae. He placed it with all the other parrots in the genus Psittacus and coined the binomial name Psittacus autumnalis. Linnaeus based his description on the "lesser green parrot" that had been described and illustrated in 1751 by the English naturalist George Edwards in the fourth volume of his A Natural History of Uncommon Birds. Edwards mistakenly believed his specimen had come from the West Indies. The type locality was later designated as southern Mexico. The red-lored amazon is now one of around thirty species placed in the genus Amazona that was introduced by the French naturalist René Lesson in 1830. The genus name is a Latinized version of the name Amazone used in the 18th century by the Comte de Buffon. The specific epithet autumnalis is Latin for "autumnal".

Three subspecies are recognised:
 A. a. autumnalis (Linnaeus, 1758) – east Mexico to north Nicaragua
 A. a. salvini (Salvadori, 1891) – north Nicaragua to southwest Colombia and northwest Venezuela
 A. a. lilacina (Lesson, R, 1844) – west Ecuador - the lilacine amazon

The lilacine amazon is considered by some authorities (such as BirdLife International) to be a distinct species, Amazona lilacina.

The diademed amazon (Amazona diadema) is sometimes considered conspecific with this species.

Description
The plumage is primarily green, with a red forehead and, in some subspecies, yellow cheeks (sometimes with red spots). The crown is blue. Adult males and females do not differ in plumage. Juveniles have less yellow on the cheeks, less red on the forehead, and dark irises.

Behavior

Food and feeding
Their food includes fruits, nuts and seeds. Like all parrots, red-lored amazons need a varied diet consisting of high quality pellets, a quality seed mix, and daily servings of fresh, bird-safe fruits and vegetables.

Breeding
The red-lored amazon nests in tree cavities. The eggs are white and there are usually three or four in a clutch. The female incubates the eggs for about 26 days and the chicks leave the nest about 60 days after hatching.

Status
In some areas, notably parts of Mexico and Venezuela, the red-lored amazon has become rare through trapping for the cagebird trade. On the other hand, it seems to be able to adapt to human-altered habitat to a considerable degree.

Aviculture
Red-lored amazons are fairly common pet parrots in the Americas. They can be devoted pets and some make fairly good talkers. Like most amazon parrots they often have a tendency to vocalize loudly, and sometimes to bite. Their behavior ranges from being quiet and curious to being aggressive, this can all be changed by basic training when the bird is of a young age. Red-lored amazons can grow up to 13 inches in length. While they largely feast on seeds, fruits and nuts, avocados and eggplants are poisonous to them and can kill them. Their average life span is up to 80 years.

Gallery

References

Further reading
 Collar, Nigel J. (1997): 313. Red-lored Amazon. In: del Hoyo, Josep; Elliott, Andrew & Sargatal, Jordi (eds.): Handbook of Birds of the World, Volume 4 (Sandgrouse to Cuckoos): 469–470, Plate 54. Lynx Edicions, Barcelona. 
 
 Foster, Mercedes S. (2007): The potential of fruiting trees to enhance converted habitats for migrating birds in southern Mexico. Bird Conservation International 17(1): 45–61.  PDF fulltext
 Herrera, Néstor; Rivera, Roberto; Ibarra Portillo, Ricardo & Rodríguez, Wilfredo (2006): Nuevos registros para la avifauna de El Salvador. ["New records for the avifauna of El Salvador"]. Boletín de la Sociedad Antioqueña de Ornitología 16(2): 1-19. [Spanish with English abstract] PDF fulltext

External links

Species profile - World Parrot Trust

red-lored amazon
Birds of Central America
Birds of Colombia
Birds of Mexico
Birds of the Sierra Madre Oriental
Birds of the Yucatán Peninsula
Feral parrots
red-lored amazon
red-lored amazon